Komorów may refer to the following places in Poland:
Komorów, Pruszków County in Masovian Voivodeship (east-central Poland)
Komorów, Oleśnica County in Lower Silesian Voivodeship (south-west Poland)
Komorów, Świdnica County in Lower Silesian Voivodeship (south-west Poland)
Komorów, Rawa County in Łódź Voivodeship (central Poland)
Komorów, Tomaszów Mazowiecki County in Łódź Voivodeship (central Poland)
Komorów, Miechów County in Lesser Poland Voivodeship (south Poland)
Komorów, Tarnów County in Lesser Poland Voivodeship (south Poland)
Komorów, Busko County in Świętokrzyskie Voivodeship (south-central Poland)
Komorów, Subcarpathian Voivodeship (south-east Poland)
Komorów, Końskie County in Świętokrzyskie Voivodeship (south-central Poland)
Komorów, Przysucha County in Masovian Voivodeship (east-central Poland)
Komorów, Warsaw West County in Masovian Voivodeship (east-central Poland)
Komorów, Greater Poland Voivodeship (west-central Poland)
Komorów, Lubusz Voivodeship (west Poland)

See also
Gmina Komarów-Osada, Zamość County, Lublin Voivodeship, in eastern Poland